Tangowali (Punjabi, Urdu: ٹانگووالی) is a village in Sargodha District of Punjab, Pakistan. Its full name is Chak No. 17-S.B.  It is situated in Sargodha, about 18 kilometers east of Sargodha District near by Kot Moman Road Sargodha. It is about 102 miles (or 164 km) to Islamabad in south, the country's capital town. This village recently become the most active and social media village of Sargodha region by getting 25,000+ SUBSCRIBERS on YouTube by getting the help from most leading service group in the village.

History
Tangowali which is commonly known as Tangowali or more famously "Kalyaran da Pind". Shepherding animals was the occupation adopted by the Tangowali people. The word "tango" means shepherding in the Punjabi language.
The History of Tangowali Starts In 1802 A family settled down here namely Chughtai,s. The Mughal dynasty was concerned with chughtai,s. After the partition in 1947 Chughtai,s were first to stable the Tangowali. It is the short story of Tangowali. It is an example of love, honesty, bravery, & simplicity.

Educational institutions 
 Government Boys High School
 Government Girls Primary School
 Shaheen Public High School (Private)
 Jinnah Grammar Boys High School (Private)
 Jamia Usmania Taleem-UL-Quran (Islamic Organization)
 Al-Sadeed Public Primary School (Private)
 Chughtai Academy (Private)

Language 
As per the 1998 census of Pakistan, 95 percent of the villagers speak the Punjabi.
Inhabitants of Tangowali speak a variety of Punjabi dialects, such as Majhi. Urdu is the mother language of few people, but as it is the national language, it is spoken and understood by most of the population.

References

External links
 Official Facebook Page

 Populated places in Sargodha District